Helmut Mayer (born 4 March 1966 in Verditz) is a former World Cup alpine ski racer from Austria. At the 1988 Winter Olympics in Calgary he won a silver medal in the Super-G competition at Nakiska. He also won a silver medal in the giant slalom at the World Championships in 1989 at Vail, Colorado.

Mayer is the father of World Cup racer Matthias Mayer, the Olympic gold medalist in downhill in 2014, and Super-G in 2018 and 2022.

World Cup victories

References

External links
 
 
 

1966 births
Living people
Austrian male alpine skiers
Olympic alpine skiers of Austria
Olympic silver medalists for Austria
Alpine skiers at the 1988 Winter Olympics
Olympic medalists in alpine skiing
Medalists at the 1988 Winter Olympics
People from Villach-Land
Sportspeople from Carinthia (state)
20th-century Austrian people
21st-century Austrian people